Cranston, once known as Pawtuxet, is a city in Providence County, Rhode Island, United States. The official population of the city in the 2020 United States Census was 82,934, making it the second largest in the state. The center of population of Rhode Island is located in Cranston. Cranston is a part of the Providence metropolitan area.

Cranston was named one of the "100 Best Places to Live" in the United States by Money magazine in 2006. Cranston ranked 36th on the list of "America's 50 Best Cities to Live" in a 2014 survey done by 24/7 Wall St.

The Town of Cranston was created in 1754 from a portion of Providence north of the Pawtuxet River. After losing much of its territory to neighboring towns and the city of Providence, Cranston itself became a city on March 10, 1910.

History
Much of the land was purchased by Roger Williams from the Narragansett Indians in 1638 as part of the Pawtuxet Purchase, and the first settler in the area was William Arnold, who was followed shortly by William Harris, William Carpenter, and Zachariah Rhodes. Stephen Arnold, a brother-in-law of Rhodes and William Arnold, built a gristmill on the Pawtuxet falls and laid out the Arnold Road (modern-day Broad Street) connecting it to the Pequot Trail leading to Connecticut. Arnold's son Benedict Arnold became the first Governor of Rhode Island under the charter of 1663. Residents were unable to agree upon a name for a new town for decades, and the Town of Cranston was eventually created by the General Assembly in 1754 from a portion of Providence north of the Pawtuxet River. Historians debate whether the town was named after Governor Samuel Cranston, the longest-serving Rhode Island governor, or his grandson Thomas Cranston, who was serving as Speaker of the Rhode Island House of Representatives at the time that the town was created. In the early 1770s, town meetings were held at the taverns of Caleb Arnold and Nehemiah Knight, where residents voted in favor of a resolution opposing the British Parliament's Coercive Acts; the town heavily supported the Patriot cause during the Revolutionary War. The town lost much of its territory to neighboring towns and the city of Providence over the nineteenth century, and Cranston became a city on March 10, 1910.

Many Italian-Americans in Cranston are descended from immigrants of Itri, Italy who settled mainly in the Knightsville section of Cranston during the early 1900s. Cranston is known for the St. Mary's Feast, inspired by the Feast of the Madonna della Civita celebrated in Itri. Since 1905, the St. Mary's Feast has been a week-long festival celebrated in July in Cranston with vendors, a carnival, fireworks, and a religious procession from St. Mary's Church on Sunday. In 2000, Cranston and Itri became sister cities.

For many years Cranston was the third-largest city in Rhode Island, after Providence and Warwick, both of which it borders. However, in 2017 it surpassed Warwick to take second place. Though Cranston's overall population density was already much greater than the geographically larger Warwick, a major factor contributing to its growth has been a large and semi-rural section west of Interstate 295, which has seen a high volume of housing development in recent years; Warwick has significantly less open land available for development.

Flood of 2010
The Pawtuxet River overflowed in March 2010 after an overwhelming amount of rain. This caused many major sites to be shut down and repaired, such as the Warwick Mall, Contour Dental Laboratories, and the CLCF Building.

Geography

It is roughly three percent of Rhode Island's total land mass.

The following neighborhoods and villages are located in Cranston:

 Alpine Estates
 Apple Hill Estates
 Arlington
 Bellefonte
 Castleton Estates
 Auburn
 Dean Estates
 Eden Park
 Edgewood
 Fiskeville (also in Scituate)
 Forest Hills
 Friendly Community
 Garden City
 Garden Hills
 Glen Woods
 Hillside Farms
 Laurel Hill
 Howard
 Jackson (also in Scituate)
 Knightsville
 Meshanticut
 Oakhill Terrace
 Oak Lawn
 Orchard Valley Estates
 Pontiac
 Stadium
 Thornton (this includes part of Johnston)
 Pawtuxet Village (also in Warwick)
 Webster
 Westend
 Woodridge
 Western Hills Village

Demographics

2020
As of the 2020 US Census, there were 82,934 people living in the city. Latino of any race were 18.1% of the population. Non-Hispanic Whites were 65.4% of the population. The racial makeup of the city was 78.78% White, 6.34% African American, 0.50% Native American, 6.23% Asian, 0.10% Pacific Islander, 4.6% from other races, and 2.66% from two or more races. 

The most common Hispanic background in Cranston is Dominican American and Guatemalan American, reflective of Rhode Island's Latino population as a whole. There is also a relatively large Cambodian American population centered around Park and Pontiac Ave in the center of the city. Italian Americans are still the predominant ethnicity throughout Cranston, numbered at 38% of the population. This gives Cranston one of the largest Italian American communities in the United States, similar to neighboring Johnston, Rhode Island and North Providence, Rhode Island.

2010
As of the 2010 US Census, there were 80,387 people living in the city. The racial makeup of the village was 81.93% White, 5.26% African American, 0.32% Native American, 5.17% Asian, 0.06% Pacific Islander, 4.6% from other races, and 2.66% from two or more races. Hispanic or Latino of any race were 10.83% of the population.

1990 census
As of the census of 1990, there were 79,269 people, 30,954 households, and 20,243 families living in the city of Cranston. The population density was 2,774.6 persons per square mile (1,071.3/km2). The racial makeup of the city was 89.19% White, 3.69% African American, 0.30% Native American, 3.28% Asian, 0.04% Pacific Islander, 1.93% from other races, and 1.57% from two or more races. Hispanic or Latino of any race were 4.56% of the population.

There were 30,954 households, out of which 28.7% had children under the age of 18 living with them, 49.2% were married couples living together, 12.5% had a female householder with no husband present, and 34.6% were non-families. 29.4% of all households were made up of individuals, and 13.1% had someone living alone who was 65 years of age or older. The average household size was 2.41 and the average family size was 3.01.

In the city the population was spread out, with 21.6% under the age of 18, 7.7% from 18 to 24, 31.5% from 25 to 44, 22.0% from 45 to 64, and 17.3% who were 65 years of age or older. The median age was 39 years. For every 100 females, there were 95.9 males. For every 100 females of age 18 or over, there were 92.8 males.

The median income for a household in the city was $44,108, and the median income for a family was $55,241. Males had a median income of $40,031 versus $28,279 for females. The per capita income for the city was $21,978. About 5.6 of families and 7.3% of the population were below the poverty line, including 8.6% of those under the age of 18 and 8.5% of those ages 65 or older.

Economy

Companies with corporate headquarters in Cranston include jewelry maker Alex and Ani and Coastway Community Bank. The first Del's Lemonade stand was opened in Cranston in 1948.

Arts and culture

Sites

The first auto race track in the country, Narragansett Park, located off Park Avenue, opened at present-day Stadium Ball Field in 1867 as a trotting track.

Cranston is home to the Budlong Pool, one of the largest outdoor swimming pools in the country. Built in the 1940s as a Works Progress Administration project, it is a staple of the community. It is located at 198 Aqueduct Road, off Reservoir Avenue (part of RI 2).

Sprague Mansion, an 18th-century homestead, is listed on the National Register of Historic Places.  The Thomas Fenner House, built around 1677, is one of the oldest houses in Rhode Island. Edgewood Yacht Club which is no longer standing was a notable structure on the National Register of Historic Places located on the Providence River.

Sports

Little League
 1996 United States Champions (CWLL)
 2015 New England Champions (CWLL)

Government
The Rhode Island Department of Corrections has its headquarters and its adult prison facilities in Cranston. The Rhode Island Department of Children, Youth & Families operates the Rhode Island Training School (RITS), a juvenile correctional facility, in Cranston. The Rhode Island Division of Motor Vehicles is headquartered in Cranston.

The City of Cranston operates under a mayor-council form of government. General city elections are held on the first Tuesday next after the first Monday in November in even numbered years. Terms for elected officials begin on the first Monday in January of the year following their election. The City Council consists of nine members: six representing each of the City wards, and three city-wide representatives. Council members are elected to a two-year term, and are limited to five consecutive two-year terms. The current Cranston City Council President is Jessica M. Marino, a city-wide representative and first woman to hold the office. Ward 1 Councilmember Lammis J. Vargas is the Vice President. The council elected for the 2023-2025 term has a 5-4 Democratic majority.

The current mayor, Kenneth J. Hopkins, was sworn in on January 4, 2021, following his election to a four-year term in November 2020. Hopkins succeeded Mayor Allan Fung, the state's first Asian-American mayor, who served four terms from 2009 to 2021. , mayors may be elected to no more than two consecutive four-year terms.

In the Rhode Island Senate, Cranston is split into four senatorial districts, all represented by Democrats: Frank S. Lombardi (District 26), Hanna M. Gallo (District 27), Joshua Miller (District 28), and Matthew LaMountain (District 31). The city is divided into all or parts of nine Rhode Island House of Representatives districts, including Districts 14, 15, 16, 17, 18, 19, 20, 41, and 42. At the federal level, Cranston is a part of Rhode Island's 2nd congressional district and is currently represented by Democrat Seth Magaziner.

In presidential elections, Cranston is reliably Democratic as no Republican presidential nominee has won the city in over three decades.

Education

Cranston High School East
Cranston High School West
Cranston Area Career And Technical Center
Western Hills Middle School
Hugh B. Bain Middle School
Park View Middle School 
Hope Highlands Middle School
Arlington Elementary School
Chester Barrows Elementary School
William R. Dutemple Elementary School
Eden Park Elementary School
Edgewood Highlands Elementary School
Garden City Elementary School
Gladstone Elementary School
Glen Hills Elementary School
Oak Lawn Elementary School
Orchard Farms Elementary School
George J. Peters Elementary School
Edward S. Rhodes Elementary School
Saint Paul School
Stadium Elementary School
Stone Hill Elementary School
Daniel D. Waterman Elementary School
Woodridge Elementary School

School Committee
The Cranston School Committee consists of seven non-partisan members, six representing each of the city wards and one city-wide representative. The current Cranston School Committee chairperson is Michael Traficante, a city-wide representative.

Infrastructure

Transportation
Four freeways travel through Cranston: I-95, I-295, RI 10 (the Huntington Expressway) and RI 37. Other state-numbered roads in Cranston are U.S. 1, US 1A, RI 2, RI 5, RI 12, RI 33, RI 51, RI 115 and RI 117.

Cranston is served by Rhode Island Public Transit Authority (RIPTA) buses. Amtrak's Northeast Corridor passes through but has no station in the city. The MBTA's Providence/Stoughton Line also passes through but does not include a station in Cranston. However, a station stop has been proposed. Currently, the nearest MBTA stations are in Providence and Warwick at T.F. Green Airport, the former which is also served by Amtrak.

Notable people

In popular culture
 Seth MacFarlane, creator of the animated sitcom Family Guy, said in an interview with a news program on WNAC-TV, Channel 64 in Providence, that the town named "Quahog" in the show is modeled after Cranston, Rhode Island.

Sister cities
  Itri, Lazio, Italy

See also

Notes

Explanatory notes

Citations

External links

 City website

 
Cities in Providence County, Rhode Island
Cities in Rhode Island
Populated coastal places in Rhode Island
Providence metropolitan area